Shirakavan may refer to:
Shirakavan (ancient city), an ancient city and one of the historic capitals of Armenia now within the Republic of Turkey
Shirakavan, Armenia, a modern village in Armenia named after the nearby ancient city of Shirakavan